Ricardo Alfonso Cerna (August 8, 1956 – December 19, 2003) was a Guatemalan immigrant to the United States who died by suicide in 2003 using a gun in an interrogation room in the San Bernardino County Sheriff's office in Muscoy, California, California. The room's video recording system was running and recorded the event. He was 47 years old.

Background
Cerna was stopped by Sheriff's Deputy Michael Parham for a traffic violation on December 19, 2003. He attempted to escape in his car and then later on foot. During the pursuit, he shot Parham twice in the abdomen, but the wound was not fatal. Cerna was arrested shortly afterward. The San Bernardino Police, the County Sheriff's Department, and the California Highway Patrol were all involved in the chase, but during his apprehension, no one ensured he was properly searched.

Video surveillance footage showed that Cerna entered the interrogation room and asked head of homicide investigation Officer Bobby Dean for a bottle of water. When Cerna received the water, he started drinking and Dean walked out of the room. Now alone, Cerna reached under his pants and retrieved a .45-caliber handgun that he had concealed. He then put the gun up to his head and shot himself in the left temple. Cerna died on the scene.

The County Sheriff's Department showed the security camera footage to the media the next day. To avoid sensationalism, only a limited number of selected reporters were permitted for viewing. Although the police tried to control access, the footage was leaked.

Possible motive
Cerna, who had previously been convicted of other serious crimes, may have understood that he would receive a third strike case for wounding Deputy Parham and possibly preferred to end his own life rather than face a possible life sentence.

References

External links
snopes.com: The Last Interrogation

1956 births
2003 deaths
Filmed deaths in the United States
Guatemalan emigrants to the United States
Deaths in police custody in the United States
People from Guatemala City
People who committed suicide in prison custody
Suicides by firearm in California
2003 suicides
Filmed suicides